Andrew Tanner Wayne (born May 18, 1988) is an American musician, best known for being the former drummer of Underminded, Scary Kids Scaring Kids, and Chiodos. He has also filled in on drums for Underoath. He is currently the drummer for Swedish heavy metal band In Flames.

Career

Underminded and Scary Kids Scaring Kids (1999–2009)
Wayne was the third drummer of the hardcore punk band Underminded, replacing Joe Mullen in 2006. He was only featured on one album, Eleven:Eleven, which was released in 2007. When asked by Something Punk about the current status of Underminded, Wayne said that "Nick Martin (vocals) and I decided that we wanted Underminded to be an open thing forever. I don't think Underminded will ever die. We've talked about possibly putting together a record next year, but who knows. Underminded is an outlet for us to do whatever the fuck we want." 
Wayne had a brief position in post-hardcore band Scary Kids Scaring Kids, but was only on one tour with the band.

Chiodos (2010–2012)
Wayne was announced to be replacing the former Chiodos drummer Derrick Frost on August 11, 2010. He was featured on their third studio album, Illuminaudio, which was released on October 5, 2010 through Equal Vision Records. According to an interview with Decoy Music, Wayne actually came up with the name of the album and explained its origin, saying that "Brad, Brandon and I were sitting in Brad's house discussing album titles. Someone brought up illuminati and I randomly said Illuminaudio. It means finding the light/positivity through sound, which ended up being a big theme on the record." On March 27, 2012, Tanner announced via his blog that he was leaving Chiodos because "our personal and business relationships went to shit."

Recent years (2014-Present)
From 2014 to spring 2016, Wayne was working as a drum tech for the band Suicide Silence.

On July 5, 2018, it was announced that Swedish metal band In Flames had recruited Wayne as the new drummer, replacing Joe Rickard.

Discography
with Underminded
Eleven:Eleven (Uprising Records, 2007)
with Chiodos
Illuminaudio (Equal Vision Records, 2010)
with In Flames
Foregone (Nuclear Blast Records, 2023)

References

1988 births
American rock drummers
Living people
Musicians from San Diego
21st-century American drummers
In Flames members
Underminded members
Chiodos members
Scary Kids Scaring Kids members